Boxing Australia Limited (BAL) is the governing body for the sport of amateur boxing in Australia. All around Australia, the development of boxing is in the hands of the BA. The Australian Sports Commission (ASC), Australian Olympic Committee (AOC), the Australian Commonwealth Games Association (ACGA), and the International Boxing Association (IBA) have recognised Boxing Australia as the National Sporting Organisation for boxing.

High Performance 
High Performance is a concept within sport that is highly focused on a group of individuals or teams with the aim of achieving individual and overall goals to achieve success.

Boxing Australia has a range of High-Performance programs.  In 1997, the Australian Institute of Sport (AIS) introduced Boxing as a scholarship sport. Its origins started out as a camp-based program, and by the early 2000s, Boxing became a full-residential program at the AIS.

In 2005 Boxing was accepted as a program sport for the Australian Sports Commission’s (ASC) National Talent Identification and Development (NTID) program which focused on identifying indigenous and heavyweight talent.

In 2011, after the removal as an AIS Residential program Boxing Australia established full-ownership and management of its High-Performance programs. The Boxing Australia Academy was established and conducted out of the Australian Institute of Sport in Canberra (Centralized camps-based).

The Boxing Australia Centre of Excellence was developed as a decentralised program within each state and territory. The purpose of the program was to identify talented boxers that have the potential to represent their state or territory at future Australian Championships.

In 2013 the AIS Combat Centre was established. The AIS Combat Centre houses the Boxing Australia training facilities.

In 2013/14 the Centre of Excellence program changed to become the BAL Development Program, with a renewed focus on adolescent athletes with the potential to make state/territory teams. The main objectives of the Development Program are to teach young boxers' terminology and skills at an early age, so as they progress through the pathway National Coaches do not need to re-teach these skills but refine them.

Boxing Australia receives support from the Australian Sports Commission with Combat AUS managing the high-performance program.

Structure
Boxing Australia adopts a Federation Style Organisational Structure with Member Association representation with a Council, a Board of Directors that are Elected, Management and Operational Staff, Standing Committees and Commissions.

Board Directors 
The overarching management and strategic focus is handled a Board of seven directors, with the ability to coopt two non-voting directors plus the Chief Executive Officer, Dinah Glykidis.

Member Association Delegates

See also

Australian National Boxing Federation which governs Professional boxing in Australia
Boxing in Australia

References

External links
 

Australia
Boxing in Australia
Sports governing bodies in Australia
1924 establishments in Australia
Sports organizations established in 1924
Amateur boxing organizations